Feather River is a stream,  long, on the Seward Peninsula in the U.S. state of Alaska. Flowing west in the Nome mining district, it debouches a little north of Cape Woolley on the Bering Sea. Its creeks include Livingston, from the east; Thistle and Wills, from the north; and Johnston, from the east.

See also
List of rivers of Alaska

References

Rivers of the Seward Peninsula
Rivers of Alaska
Rivers of Nome Census Area, Alaska
Rivers of Unorganized Borough, Alaska